The Xingezhuang Formation is an Upper Cretaceous fossil bearing rock formation in China. It is located near Zhucheng, in the province of Shandong.

Dinosaur finds

Ceratopsians

Ornithopods

Sauropods

Theropods

Thyreophorans

Reptilia

See also 
 List of dinosaur-bearing rock formations

References 

Geologic formations of China
Upper Cretaceous Series of Asia
Cretaceous China
Maastrichtian Stage
Lagerstätten
Fossiliferous stratigraphic units of Asia
Paleontology in Shandong